Solomon George Haven (November 27, 1810 – December 24, 1861) was a U.S. Representative from New York and Mayor of the City of Buffalo, New York, serving in 1846–1847.

Biography
He was born in Guilford, New York on November 27, 1810. He taught school and studied law and on January 10, 1835, moved to Buffalo and finished his studies in the law offices of Fillmore & Hall, the partnership of Millard Fillmore and Nathan K. Hall, later becoming a partner. On May 2, 1838, Haven married Harriett N. Scott.  In 1843 he was appointed district attorney of Erie County.

On March 3, 1846, he was elected mayor of Buffalo. During his term, the city charter was amended to give the mayor veto power and the Buffalo Commercial Advertiser was designated as the newspaper of the city.  On March 9, 1847, Haven's term as mayor ended.

Haven was elected as a Whig to the Thirty-second and Thirty-third Congresses, and reelected as an Opposition Party candidate to the Thirty-fourth Congress (March 4, 1851 – March 3, 1857).

He was an unsuccessful candidate for reelection in 1856 to the Thirty-fifth Congress and for election in 1860 to the Thirty-seventh Congress.  He engaged in the practice of his profession until his death in Buffalo, New York, December 24, 1861. He was interred in Forest Lawn Cemetery.

References

External links

1810 births
1861 deaths
People from Guilford, New York
Whig Party members of the United States House of Representatives from New York (state)
Opposition Party members of the United States House of Representatives from New York (state)
Mayors of Buffalo, New York
Burials at Forest Lawn Cemetery (Buffalo)
19th-century American politicians
Erie County District Attorneys